Zach Lipovsky is a Canadian director, former child actor and visual effects specialist.

Career
Lipovsky was a finalist on the first season of the Fox reality show On the Lot where he placed 5th out of 12,000 directors worldwide. He went on to direct the films Tasmanian Devils, Leprechaun: Origins and Dead Rising: Watchtower.

In 2019, he directed and produced the DisneyXD series Mech-X4 for which he was nominated for a Daytime Emmy. Following that he co-directed the live-action Disney film Kim Possible and wrote and directed the sci-fi thriller Freaks, both with writing and directing partner Adam Stein. In 2022, Lipovksy and Stein were announced as the directors for Final Destination 6.

Selected filmography

As director 
Crazy Late (2005, for Crazy8s)
Danger Zone (2007, as part of On the Lot)
Sunshine Girl (2007, as part of On the Lot)
Die Hardly Working (2007, as part of On the Lot)
Time Upon a Once (2007, as part of On the Lot)
Tasmanian Devils (2013)
Leprechaun: Origins (2014)
Dead Rising: Watchtower (2015)
Freaks (2018)
Kim Possible (2019)

As actor
Goosebumps (1996, Vampire Breath, as Freddy Renfield)
The Angel of Pennsylvania Avenue (1996, as Henry)
Big and Hairy (1998, as Owen 'O' O'Malley)
You, Me and the Kids (1998–2001, 5 episodes, as Tyler / Bully)
Zenon: Girl of the 21st Century (1999, as Matt)
So Weird (1999, Escape, as Dan)
Hayley Wagner, Star (1999, as Debate Club Guy)
Mr. Rice's Secret (2000, as Funnel 'Funnel Head' McConnell)

See also
 List of On the Lot films

References

External links

Canadian male screenwriters
Canadian television personalities
Living people
Participants in American reality television series
Year of birth missing (living people)